"Lord, Send Me an Angel" is a song by Blind Willie McTell of which two versions were recorded on September 19, 1933 in New York City, with Curley Weaver on second guitar. Accompanied by his wife, Kate, McTell re-recorded it as "Ticket Agent Blues" in 1935, albeit with some alternate verses. This was used as the B-side to his single "Bell Street Blues" on Decca Records. The song was covered by Detroit, Michigan garage rock band, The White Stripes, which was released as a single in October 2000.

The original version of the song begins with a dialogue between the singer and God. The former asks for an angel and the latter says, having no angels, He'll send "a teasin' brown". The rest of the lyrics describe the singer's promiscuity and liking for women of different complexions: "One woman's Atlanta yellow, the other is Macon brown, but the Statesboro blackskin will turn your damper down". The song ends with the singer addressing a lover, saying he's leaving her and that she'll be sorry she drove him away, perhaps wishful thinking judging by the way he claims to regard women.

The alternate verses of "Ticket Agent Blues" lengthens the song, telling a story of the protagonist seeking his lover at a train station, describing her appearance to the ticket agent, and includes a warning to avoid relationships with married women, "cause their husband will grab ya, and beat ya ragged as a cedar tree". The song then ends in a similar fashion, the addressing a lover to tell her he's leaving her; however, this time the singer warns "I'ma tell you pretty mama exactly who I am, when I walk in that front door and hear that back door slam".

The White Stripes single
The White Stripes' cover version features a few changes to the original lyrics: Frontman Jack White's name replaces McTell's, and Detroit replaces Macon and Georgia as place names.

Track listing

References
[ AllMusic: "Lord, Send Me an Angel"]. Retrieved September 21, 2005.

2000 singles
The White Stripes songs
1933 songs
Wikipedia requested audio of songs